The East African springhare (Pedetes surdaster), is not closely related to the hare, which is a lagomorph, but is a member of the Pedetidae, a rodent family.

Taxonomy
Pedetes surdaster was recognised by Matthee and Robinson in 1997 as a species distinct from the southern African springhare (P. capensis) based on genetic, morphological, and ethological differences.  P. capensis from South Africa has fewer chromosomes (2n= 38) than does P. surdaster which has (2n = 40) and some other genetic variations. The species was confirmed by Dieterlen in 2005.

Unlike South African springhare (Pedetes capensis), the second and third cervical vertebrae are fused in this species.

Distribution
This species is found in central and southern Kenya and most of Tanzania. A single specimen has been recorded in Uganda near the Kenya border, at Mount Moroto. It is found from sea level up to an altitude over 2,000 m.

Description
The East African springhare resembles a small kangaroo (a marsupial in the family Macropodidae of Oceania), and is possibly about the size of a rabbit (Oryctolagus cuniculus). It is mid-brown, has large erect ears, very short fore legs, and long powerful hind legs. It moves in bounds of up to 2 m and has a long tail fringed with black hairs which provides balance. It can sit up on its haunches like a squirrel.

Ecology
The East African springhare is nocturnal and spends the day in an extensive system of burrows. It lives in semiarid grassland habitats. The diet is the green parts of plants, roots and other vegetable matter, and occasionally insects.

References

East African springhare
Mammals of Kenya
Mammals of Tanzania
Fauna of East Africa
East African springhare